The 2019–20 Gardner–Webb Runnin' Bulldogs men's basketball team represented Gardner–Webb University in the 2019–20 NCAA Division I men's basketball season. The Runnin' Bulldogs, led by seventh-year head coach Tim Craft, played their home games at the Paul Porter Arena in Boiling Springs, North Carolina as members of the Big South Conference. They finished the season 16–16, 11–7 in Big South play to finish in third place. They defeated UNC Asheville in the quarterfinals of the Big South tournament before losing in the semifinals to Winthrop.

Previous season
The Runnin' Bulldogs finished the 2018–19 season 23–12 overall, 10–6 in Big South play to finish in a tie for second place. In the Big South tournament, they defeated High Point in the first round, upset top-seeded Campbell in the quarterfinals, to advance to the championship game, where they faced Radford, ultimately winning the game, marking Gardner–Webb's first ever appearance in the NCAA Tournament in school history. They received the Big South's automatic bid to the NCAA tournament, where they were defeated in the first round by Virginia.

Roster

Schedule and results

|-
!colspan=12 style=| Non-conference regular season

|-
!colspan=9 style=| Big South Conference regular season

|-
!colspan=12 style=| Big South tournament
|-

|-

Source

References

Gardner–Webb Runnin' Bulldogs men's basketball seasons
Gardner-Webb Runnin' Bulldogs
Gardner-Webb Runnin' Bulldogs men's basketball
Gardner-Webb Runnin' Bulldogs men's basketball